was a Japanese television drama starring Tsuyoshi Kusanagi and Kyoko Fukada. It first aired in Japan from 1 July 2000 to 30 September 2000. Moderately successful, its average rating was 17.5% while its peak rating reached 21.5%.

Cast
 Ihara Mitsuru – Tsuyoshi Kusanagi
 Tamura Manami – Kyoko Fukada
 Miyazono Saeka – Rie Miyazawa
 Miyazono Kyosaku – Shiro Sano
 Kisaragi Eiichi – Kakei Toshio
 Crow's voice – Takuya Kimura

Characters

Ihara Mitsuru – a custodian working for a large food producer after growing up in an orphanage who is secretly a champion of a food eating competition. After winning he usually proclaims his stomach is as huge as the size of the universe.
Tamura Manami – a college student who volunteers for an orphanage where Mitsuru was raised
Miyazono Saeka – the wife of Miyazono; she married him solely for money
Miyazono Kyosaku – the head of the large food production company who secretly sponsors the underground "food fight"; the eleventh challenger
Kisaragi Eiichi – the ninth challenger of the "food fight"; after deciding that Mitsuru is a natural-born "food fighter" he analyzes the challengers and gives helpful advice to him
Kyutaro – a talking black bird who is a friend and partner of Mitsuru; voiced by Takuya Kimura

The challengers
The list runs in a chronological order with the food of each challenger's choice.
Yoneyama Katsuyoshi – ramen
Gonzales Iwagami – spicy curry
Fujishiro Yukiko – Kakigori
Manaka Hiromi – Mochi
Kagami Shunsuke – yakitori
Ihara Satoko – Croquette
Carlos Okamura – steak
Kisaragi Eiichi - Hiyashi Chuka/Cold noodles
Sugawara Kentaro – sushi
Miyazono Kyosaku - Onigiri

Summary
The president of a large food production company combines gourmet eating and gambling into an underground eating contest, or "Food Fight," in the basement of his company. After growing up in an orphanage, Mitsuru Ihara starts working as a custodian at the large food producer. The pleasant, kind Ihara often visits his former home, pretending to be an important business man, not the blue-collar cleaner that he really is. He also has a bigger secret, which is, he is the reigning champion of the underground eating competition held at the company. In it, two contestants battle to see who can pack away more food within a set time limit. The noble Ihara, with nine consecutive wins, always donates the prize money anonymously to his orphanage, despite the fact that he wins millions. The circumstances surrounding his victories, however, are often surprising and usually unusual, perhaps unrealistic. He also wins by a very small margin, by only 1 point in most cases.

Trivia
 Three former members of Morning Musume (Natsumi Abe, Maki Goto, and Yuko Nakazawa), and singer Ryuichi Kawamura made guest appearances on this show as themselves.

Special episode

Hong Kong Battle

In the final episode, Mitsuru collapsed at the counter of the beef bowl restaurant ( Matsuya ) that he stopped by after the match with Miyazono (It ended as he had lost his life). He is nowhere to be seen, the beef bowl with miso soup ordered was empty. Retired from the food fighter, He is still alive and became a full-time employee of Miyazono General Foods. At the beginning, he lost his memory and since Mitsuru was found at Matsuya he was called "Matsu-kun" by the boy who hide him. The Battle struggles with memory and appetite loss. His memory returns during the Xiaolongbao confrontation with Liang and he revived as a food fighter.

Midnight Express Death Fight

As before, he was struggling to win. Kinichi Hagimoto played a powerful enemy boss. Who challenged him with wounds all over his body in a series of battles. Took his quote "My stomach is the universe" and Mitsuru was completely defeated. He collapsed and Mitsuru's sister appeared mysteriously at the end. Leaving some lead to further a sequels. The story remained unfinished and sequel was not produced due to the impact of the an accident that occurred later. The Train vehicle that appeared was 113 series.

Sealed work
This work was a hit, with two special episode being produced even after the broadcast ended. But on January 15, 2002, junior high school students in Aichi Prefecture have bread-eating competition during school lunch and choked death happen on April 24 the same year. Due to this accident the sequel stop without further production. Rebroadcast, VHS, DVD, or Internet distribution, and since then all ceased. It has been virtually a sealed work. In addition, due to the impact of this accident. Similar work from TBS and TV Tokyo. Which were producing fast-eating competition programs at the time, temporarily stopped on the subject.

However on the August 23rd 2000, The Victor Entertainment original soundtrack work was released.

Not everything is treated as the fact that the work itself never existed. Tsuyoshi Kusanagi, who starred in this work. He seems like to use the quote "My stomach is the universe!" Even after the end of this work, he often said this line in the food variety show he appeared in.

On June 5, 2022, " ABEMA distributed on 7.2 New Another Window ", Tsuyoshi Kusanagi said in the program that he would not do gluttonous work again.

External links
Food Fight at J-dorama
フードファイト Japan wikipedia

2000 Japanese television series debuts
2000 Japanese television series endings
Japanese drama television series
Nippon TV dramas